Tahmasp Khan Jalayer was one of the most prominent and battle-hardened generals of the Naderian wars and served Nader Shah from the very early days of his military career in Khorasan until he was forced to rebel during the last year of Nader's reign as Shah.

Tahmasp Jalayer was present in many of the key engagements of Nader's career and was instrumental in Reza Qoli Mirza Afshar's military successes against the Uzbeks. He fought alongside Nader in the Battle of Karnal where he commanded the right wing of the Iranian army. During the last years of Nader's rule in Iran he was forced into rebellion as Nader, who at this point had begun to slip further into insanity and paranoia, declared him a traitor to test his loyalties. Adil Shah convinced him that open rebellion against Nader was the only solution but later Tahmasp Jalayer showed signs of wanting to be reconciled with Nader and so Adil Shah had him killed. The irony of his death was that he died as a loyal subject in open rebellion against a Shah who had forsaken him.

Sources 
Axworthy, Michael (2009). The Sword of Persia: Nader Shah, from tribal warrior to conquering tyrant, I. B. Tauris

Safavid generals
Afsharid generals